Verovka is a rural locality (a selo) in Usen-Ivanovsky Selsoviet, Belebeyevsky District, Bashkortostan, Russia. The population was 357 as of 2010. There are 5 streets.

Geography 
Verovka is located 35 km east of Belebey (the district's administrative centre) by road. Chermasan is the nearest rural locality.

References 

Rural localities in Belebeyevsky District